Mervyn William Rutherford Jaffray (born 18 January 1949) is a former New Zealand rugby union player. A back rower, Jaffray represented Otago at a provincial level, and was a member of the New Zealand national side, the All Blacks, on their 1976 tour to South America. He played four matches for the All Blacks but no full internationals.

References

1949 births
Living people
Rugby union players from Dunedin
People educated at Kaikorai Valley College
New Zealand rugby union players
New Zealand international rugby union players
Otago rugby union players
Rugby union flankers
Rugby union number eights
New Zealand rugby union coaches